The following ships of the Royal Thai Navy have been named Prasae:

Royal Thai Navy ship names